Helpston railway station was a station in Helpston, Cambridgeshire, on the Midland Railway's Syston and Peterborough Railway. It was closed in 1966. The Great Northern Railway main line runs adjacent to the Midland Railway at this point, but the Great Northern never had a station in Helpston. This was due to an agreement whereby the Midland carried materials to the site during construction of the Great Northern, and in return the Great Northern offered no competition for services on this section.

The goods shed survives, as does the Great Northern Railway signal box, which is now used only to monitor a number of level crossings in the vicinity. Helpston level crossing itself carries the Helpston to Glinton road over the four tracks of the ex-GNR line and the two tracks of the ex-MR line. This was previously two separate level crossings, controlled by two separate signal boxes. There was space for two cars between the level crossings. The crossings were merged and converted from gates to full barriers in the 1970s.

References 

Disused railway stations in Cambridgeshire
Transport in Peterborough
Buildings and structures in Peterborough
Railway stations in Great Britain opened in 1846
Railway stations in Great Britain closed in 1966
Former Midland Railway stations
Beeching closures in England
1846 establishments in England